The 1933–34 FAW Welsh Cup is the 53rd season of the annual knockout tournament for competitive football teams in Wales.

Key
League name pointed after clubs name.
B&DL - Birmingham & District League
FL D2 - Football League Second Division
FL D3N - Football League Third Division North
FL D3S - Football League Third Division South
MWL - Mid-Wales Football League
SFL - Southern Football League
WLN - Welsh League North
WLS D1 - Welsh League South Division One
W&DL - Wrexham & District Amateur League

First round

Second round
14 winners from the First round plus two new clubs. Porthmadog and Blaina get a bye to the Third round.

Third round
Seven winners from the Second round, Porthmadog, Blaina plus 13 new clubs. Bethesda Victoria get a bye.

Fourth round
8 winners from the Third round plus Bethesda Victoria and one new club - Merthyr Town. Barry, Penrhiwceiber and Bangor City get a bye to the Fifth round.

Fifth round
Five winners from the Fourth round plus Barry, Penrhiwceiber and Bangor City.

Sixth round
Four winners from the Fifth round plus 12 new clubs.

Seventh round

Semifinal
Bristol City and Port Vale played at Chester.

Final
Final were held at Wrexham, replay were held at Chester.

External links
The FAW Welsh Cup

1933-34
Wales
Cup